The 2021 Women's Indoor African Cup was held in Durban, South Africa. It was originally scheduled from 25 to 27 September 2020, but was postponed due to the COVID-19 pandemic. On 30 December 2020 it was announced the tournament was rescheduled to be held from 15 to 18 April 2021.

The competition featured three teams, with the winner securing a place in the 2022 Women's FIH Indoor Hockey World Cup.  The defending champions Namibia won the title by defeating the hosts South Africa 2–0 in the final.

Results

Standings

Fixtures
All times are local (UTC+2).

Final

Statistics

Final standings

Awards
The following awards were given at the conclusion of the tournament.

Goalscorers

See also
2021 Men's Indoor Africa Cup

References

Indoor African Cup
indoor hockey
International women's field hockey competitions hosted by South Africa
Sports competitions in Durban
Indoor African Cup
Indoor African Cup
Africa Cup